Kaan Akça (born 21 February 1994) is a German footballer who plays as a midfielder for Mittelrheinliga club FC Pesch.

References

External links
 

1994 births
Footballers from Cologne
German people of Turkish descent
Living people
German footballers
Association football midfielders
Fortuna Düsseldorf II players
Fortuna Düsseldorf players
2. Bundesliga players
Regionalliga players
Oberliga (football) players